Kassir is a surname. Notable people with the surname include:

Amal Kassir (born 1995), spoken word poet
John Kassir (born 1957), American actor and comedian
Oussama Kassir (born 1966), Lebanese-born Swedish militant Islamist and criminal
Samir Kassir (1960–2005), Lebanese-Palestinian-French professor of history
Victor Kassir (1910–1997), Lebanese businessman and politician